This is a list of notable people, past and present who have lived in Ridgefield, Connecticut or are closely associated with the town, listed by area in which they are best known:

Authors, writers, playwrights, screenwriters

 Silvio A. Bedini (1917–2007), retired Smithsonian Institution curator, author, born and raised in Ridgefield
 Rich Cohen (born 1968), non-fiction writer
 Howard Fast (1914–2003), novelist
 Ira Joe Fisher (born 1947), CBS weatherman and poet (Some Holy Weight in the Village Air)
 Robert Fitzgerald (1910–1985), poet, critic and translator; he and his wife Sally called Ridgefield home and many sources repeat the assertion, though their residence was located in neighboring Redding
 Tom Gilroy, screenwriter, actor and film producer, graduated from Ridgefield High School in 1978
 Max Gunther (1926–1998), journalist and writer
 Tim Herlihy (born 1966), screenwriter, film producer, former head writer of Saturday Night Live
 Roger Kahn (1927–2020), author
 Irene Kampen (1923–1998), novelist and journalist
 Richard Kluger (born 1934), author
 Clare Boothe Luce (1903–1987), playwright, ambassador, politician, and wife of Henry Luce
 Andy Luckey (born 1965), children's book author
 John Ames Mitchell (1844–1918), novelist, founder of Life magazine
 Allan Nevins (1891–1971), only writer to win the Pulitzer prize for historical biography twice (on Grover Cleveland and Hamilton Fish)
 Flannery O'Connor (1925–1964), writer often said to have lived in town when she was a boarder of Robert Fitzgerald's from 1949–1951, although Fitzgerald actually lived in neighboring Redding
 Eugene O'Neill (1888–1953), Nobel Prize-winning playwright, owned Brook Farm on North Salem Road from 1922 to 1927
 Brad Parks (born 1974), author
 Cornelius J. Ryan (1920–1974), author
 Mark Salzman (born 1959), author and actor who wrote about the town in his novel Lost in Place: Growing Up Absurd in Suburbia
 Richard Scarry (1919–1994), children's author
 Maurice Sendak (1928–2012), author and artist
 Fred Stahl (born 1944), Professor (Columbia University), author, pioneer computer scientist, computer security and forensics, science historian, inventor, lexicographer, real estate developer (current resident) 
 Robert Lewis Taylor (1912–1998), Pulitzer Prize-winning novelist (The Travels of Jaimie McPheeters, 1959)
 Alvin Toffler (1928–2016), futurist, author
 Abigail Goodrich Whittlesey (1788–1858), educator, publisher, editor
 Max Wilk (1920–2011), author
 Bari Wood (born 1936), author

Actors, others in the dramatic arts

 David Cassidy (1950–2017), actor and singer
 Ralph Edwards (1913–2005), producer and host of television show Truth or Consequences
 Chris Elliott (born 1960), actor, comedian, author
 Giancarlo Esposito (born 1958), actor (current resident)
 Harvey Fierstein (born 1954), actor and playwright  (current resident)
 Walter Hampden (1879–1955), actor
 Carolyn Kepcher (born 1969), appeared on the NBC show The Apprentice and ran Donald Trump's golf course in Briarcliff, New York (current resident)
 Cyril Ritchard (1897–1977), actor
 Grant Rosenmeyer (born 1991), actor
 Erland Van Lidth de Jeude (1953–1987), actor, wrestler, computer engineer and singer, grew up on Short Lane
 Robert Vaughn (1932–2016), actor

Singers, musicians, composers

 Larry Adler (1914–2001), harmonica virtuoso, lived on Pumping Station Road
 Judy Collins (born 1939), Grammy-award-winning folk singer (current resident)
 Aaron Copland (1900–1990), lived on Limestone Road
 Fanny Crosby (1820–1915), wrote more than 8,000 hymns, lived as a child at the corner of Main Street and Branchville Road
 Edwina Eustis Dick (1908–1997), contralto, pioneer in the field of music therapy, lived on Old Branchville Road
 Geraldine Farrar (1882–1967), Metropolitan Opera soprano, lived on West Lane and later New Street, where she died
 Andrew Gold (1951–2011), singer, songwriter, and musician, lived on St. Johns Road
 Stephen Jenks (1772–1856), composer and "teacher of psalmody", lived in Ridgefield
 Ed Kowalczyk (born 1971), singer, songwriter, musician and a founding member of the band Live
 Jim Lowe  (1927–2016) singer, disc jockey and radio host
 Václav Nelhýbel (1919–1996), composer
 Alex North (1910–1991), film composer
 Noël Regney (1922–2002), pianist and songwriter
 Stephen Schwartz (born 1948), composer and lyricist (current resident)
 Debbie Shapiro (born 1954), singer (current resident)
 Maxim Shostakovich (born 1938), conductor (past resident)
 Jim Steinman (1947–2021), composer, lyricist, record producer, and playwright

Artists, architects, designers, cartoonists

 Peggy Bacon (1895–1987), author and artist with works in the National Gallery of Art and Metropolitan Museum of Art
 Wayne Boring (1915–1982), an artist of Superman comic strips, lived on Lincoln Lane
 Sarah Bostwick (born 1979), visual artist
 Orlando Busino (born 1926), cartoonist and author (current resident)
 Roz Chast (born 1954), New Yorker cartoonist and book author (current resident)
 Niels Diffrient (1928–2013), industrial designer
 Cass Gilbert (1859–1934), architect
 Alexander Isley (born 1961), designer and educator (current resident)
 Alexander Julian (born 1948), designer (current resident)
 Nicholas Krushenick (1929–1999), abstract artist, a dozen of whose works are in the National Gallery of Art 
 Erik Nitsche (1908–1998), graphic designer
 Frederic Remington (1861–1909),  painter, illustrator, and sculptor; died in Ridgefield in 1909, less than six months after moving to the town
 Julian Alden Weir (1852–1919), impressionist painter, bought Nod Hill Farm in 1882, now a National Historic Site 
 Mahonri Young (1877–1957), grandson of Brigham Young; artist and sculptor

Businesspeople

 Lawrence Bossidy (born 1935), retired CEO of AlliedSignal and General Electric (current resident)
 E.P. Dutton (1831–1923), publisher 
 Joseph M. Juran (1904–1908), founder of the Juran Institute, lived on Old Branchville Road
 Hans Peter Kraus (1907–1988), rare book dealer,  author of A Rare Book Saga
 Arvind Krishna, CEO of IBM (current resident)
 John R. Patrick (born 1945), former IBM vice-president and innovative leader in the information technology industry, author of Net Attitude
 Jay S. Walker (born 1955), Priceline.com founder (current resident)
 Stephen Ward Jr., retired CEO of Lenovo (current resident)

Journalists

 Todd Brewster, author, documentary film producer, former Senior Editorial Producer, ABC News (current resident)
 Morton Dean (born 1935), television journalist (current resident)
 Henry Luce (1898–1967), founder of Time magazine, husband of Clare Boothe Luce
 David Manning, fictitious film reviewer said to be with the Ridgefield Press but created in a deceptive advertising campaign
 Westbrook Pegler (1894–1969), columnist and Pulitzer Prize winner (resident, 1941–1948)

Government

 Joel Abbot (1776–1826), United States Congressman
 Jeremiah Donovan (1857–1935), United States Representative from Connecticut
 John H. Frey (born 1963), Minority Whip, Connecticut House of Representatives; Connecticut National Committeeman, Republican National Committee
 George E. Lounsbury (1838–1904), former Connecticut governor 
 Phineas C. Lounsbury (1841–1925), former Connecticut governor
 Clare Boothe Luce (1903–1987), playwright, ambassador, politician, wife of Henry Luce
 Theodore Sorensen (1928–2010), JFK advisor
 Norman Thomas (1884–1968), six-time Socialist candidate for president, spent summers in Ridgefield until the early 1920s
 Kurt Waldheim (1918–2007), U.N. secretary-general (1972–1981), frequently stayed at the estate of a friend in town

Other

 Anthony Alfredo (born 1999), NASCAR driver
 Blackleach Burritt (1744–1794), noted clergyman in the American Revolution
 Jolie Gabor (1896–1997), jewelry store-owing mother of the famous Gabor sisters—Eva, Magda, and Zsa Zsa—had a home on Oscaleta Road from 1966 to 1970
 Samuel Keeler (1656–1713), founding settler of Ridgefield
 Jeff Landau (born 1974), professional tennis player
 "Typhoid Mary" Mallon (1869–1938), who became famous for infecting people with typhoid, spent some time as a cook in town, where she infected some (according to brief front-page story in the July 22, 1909 Ridgefield Press)
 Matt Merullo (born 1965), former baseball player and scout for Arizona Diamondbacks
 Elmer Q. Oliphant (1892–1975), played with NFL's Buffalo All-Americans (1920s)
 Alice Paul, author of the proposed Equal Rights Amendment, author and suffragist, part-time resident (1885–1977)
 George Scalise, owned a mansion on Lake Mamanasco, president of the Building Service Employees International Union
 Kieran Smith, competitive swimmer, Olympian
 Tucker West (born 1995), Olympic luger

See also
 List of people from Connecticut
 List of people from Bridgeport, Connecticut
 List of people from Brookfield, Connecticut
 List of people from Darien, Connecticut
 List of people from Greenwich, Connecticut
 List of people from Hartford, Connecticut
 List of people from New Canaan, Connecticut
 List of people from New Haven, Connecticut
 List of people from Norwalk, Connecticut
 List of people from Redding, Connecticut
 List of people from Stamford, Connecticut
 List of people from Westport, Connecticut

Footnotes

External links
"Notable Ridgefielders" webpage

People from Ridgefield
People from Fairfield County, Connecticut
 
Ridgefield Connecticut